Microtropis zeylanica is a species of plant in the family Celastraceae. It is endemic to Sri Lanka.

External links
 http://plants.jstor.org/specimen/k000669918
 https://www.biodiversitylibrary.org/name/Microtropis%20zeylanica

Endemic flora of Sri Lanka
zeylanica
Vulnerable plants